{{DISPLAYTITLE:C19H20N2O3}}
The molecular formula C19H20N2O3 (molar mass: 324.37 g/mol, exact mass: 324.1474 u) may refer to:

 Ditazole
 Dolasetron
 Oxyphenbutazone